PG5 is the largest stable synthetic molecule ever made. PG5 was designed by the organic chemistry research group working at the Federal Institute of Technology in Zürich.

Properties 
PG5 has a molecular mass of about 200 MDa or 200,000,000 g/mol. It has roughly 20 million atoms and a diameter of roughly 10 nm. Its length is up to a few micrometers. It is similar in size to a tobacco mosaic virus with comparable length and diameter. PG5 was shown to be resistant against attempts to flatten the structure.

References 

Polymers
Dihydroxybenzoic acids
Amides
Dendrimers